Diploschizia is a genus of sedge moths. It was described by John B. Heppner in 1981. It is mostly treated as a synonym of Glyphipterix.

Species
 Diploschizia glaucophanes
 Diploschizia habecki
 Diploschizia impigritella
 Diploschizia kimballi
 Diploschizia kutisi
 Diploschizia lanista
 Diploschizia mexicana
 Diploschizia minimella
 Diploschizia regia
 Diploschizia seminolensis
 Diploschizia tetratoma
 Diploschizia urophora

References

Glyphipterigidae